Dianema is a small genus of freshwater catfish in the Callichthyinae subfamily of the armored catfish family. The type species for this genus is Dianema longibarbis.  The name is derived from the Greek di, meaning "two", and nema, meaning "filament". The two species of Dianema share approximately the same distribution, and are found in the Amazon River and lower courses of its tributaries. Dianema species have the habit of swimming midwater, as opposed to the bottom as in most callichthyids.

Species 
There are currently two described species in this genus:
Dianema longibarbis Cope, 1872 (Porthole catfish)
Dianema urostriatum (A. Miranda-Ribeiro, 1912) (Flagtail catfish)

References

Callichthyidae

Catfish genera
Taxa named by Edward Drinker Cope
Freshwater fish genera